Porter Township is a township in Christian County, Missouri. It was established in 1860 and was named after Joseph Porter, a Porter citizen.

References

Townships in Missouri
Townships in Christian County, Missouri